Erik Messerschmidt, ASC, (born October 23, 1980) is an American cinematographer. He is best known for his collaborations with director David Fincher on the films Mank (as director of photography) and Gone Girl (as gaffer), and on the Netflix series Mindhunter. He has also shot episodes of the TV series Fargo, Legion, and Raised by Wolves. His work has been nominated for an Emmy. In April 2021, he won the top ASC Award and the Academy Award for Best Cinematography for Mank.

Personal life
Messerschmidt grew up in Cape Elizabeth, Maine. He studied film production at Emerson College in Boston, where he was a classmate of filmmaker Jeremiah Zagar and served as co-director of photography on Zagar's award winning indie documentary In a Dream (2008). In May 2020, he married Naiara Eizaguirre-Paulos.

Career
After relocating to Los Angeles, Messerschmidt served as gaffer on TV series such as Bones, Everybody Hates Chris, and Mad Men. He also gained experience as a director of photography during this time, shooting commercials, short films, and documentaries. Messerschmidt had a working relationship with cinematographer Jeff Cronenweth, who recommended him to director David Fincher. Fincher hired Messerschmidt as gaffer on Gone Girl and, later, as director of photography for most episodes of Mindhunter and for Mank. With Mindhunter, Messerschmidt explained the color palette, "has a desaturated green-yellow look... [it] helps give the show its period feel". He stated the effect is achieved through production design, costumes and filming locations—not necessarily through lighting used on set.

Awards and recognition
In 2009, Messerschmidt and Mark Stetz were nominated for the Golden Frog Award at Camerimage, The International Film Festival of the Art of Cinematography, for their work on In a Dream.

On February 5, 2020, Messerschmidt was admitted as a member of the American Society of Cinematographers.

On July 28, 2020, he was nominated for a Primetime Emmy Award for his work on "Episode 6" of the Netflix series Mindhunters second season, for the category Outstanding Cinematography for a Single-Camera Series (One Hour). The award went to M. David Mullen for an episode of Amazon Prime Video's The Marvelous Mrs. Maisel.

On December 17, 2020, Messerschmidt's work on Mank was nominated for the Florida Film Critics Circle Award for Best Cinematography. On December 21, it was announced that he had won the award.

On April 18, 2021, he won the top award from the American Society of Cinematographers, Outstanding Achievement in Cinematography in Theatrical Releases, for his work on Mank.

On April 25, 2021, he won the Academy Award for Best Cinematography for Mank.

Filmography 
Film

Documentery

Television

References

External links 
 

1980 births
American cinematographers
Best Cinematographer Academy Award winners
Emerson College alumni
Living people
People from Cape Elizabeth, Maine